The 1967 World Table Tennis Championships – Corbillon Cup (women's team) was the 22nd edition of the women's team championship. 

Japan won the gold medal, the Soviet Union won the silver medal and Hungary won the bronze medal.

Medalists

Second stage

Final tables

Group A

Group B

Third-place playoff

Final

See also
List of World Table Tennis Championships medalists

References

-
1967 in women's table tennis